{{Speciesbox
| image = Crambidae - Palpita vitrealis.jpg
| image_caption = Moth of Palpita vitrealis
| taxon = Palpita vitrealis
| authority = (Rossi, 1794)
| synonyms_ref = 
|synonyms={{collapsible list|bullets = true
|Palpita unionalis (Hübner, 1796)
|Botys jucundalis  Lederer, 1863
|Botys quinquepunctalis  Boisduval, 1833
|Margarodes septempunctalis  Mabille, 1880
|Margarodes transvisalis Guenée, 1854
|Orphanostigma versicolor  Warren, 1896
|Phalaena vitrealis  Rossi, 1794
|Pyralis unionalis  Hübner, 1796
|Syngamia latimarginalis  (Walker, 1859) 
}}}}Palpita vitrealis, common name jasmine moth or white pearl, is a species of moth of the family Crambidae. 

Distribution
This species occurs worldwide, including Africa (Equatorial Guinea, Gambia, Kenya, Sierra Leone, South Africa), Asia, Australia and Europe. In Europe, it is mainly found in southern Europe, but may be found further north. Plantwise Knowledge Banl

Description

The wingspan of Palpita vitrealis can reach 27–31 mm. The body and the wings are translucent with a slight sheen. Eyes are large and reddish-brown. On the upper edge of the forewings is present a rather broad orange or brown border. The forewings also show two black spots in the middle. Legs are white and brown ringed.

Biology
These moths mainly fly from August till late October, depending on the location. They feed on nectar of various flowers, including ivy and buddleia.Catalogue of lepidoptera of Belgium This species shows a migratory nature. The larvae are initially yellow, later becoming green. They can  grow to a length of about 2 cms. They feed on the leaves of the host plants, mainly jasmine (Jasminum officinale), privet (Ligustrum species), Forsythia, Arbutus unedo and european olive (Olea europaea).  In Africa the preferred host plants are Sida rhombifolia, Grewia, Helicteres isora, Schima noronhae and Randia scortechinii''.  The larvae are considered a pest of olive fields, as they attack the leaves and fruits. The final instar of the larvae spins some leaves together and form a silky cocoon to pupate.

References

External links
 
 
 Paolo Mazzei, Daniel Morel, Raniero Panfili Moths and Butterflies of Europe and North Africa
 iNaturalist
 Lepinet
 Papillons de Poitou-Charentes
 Lepidoptera Larvae of Australia

vitrealis
Cosmopolitan moths
Moths described in 1794
Taxa named by Pietro Rossi